The 1990–91 DePaul Blue Demons men's basketball team represented DePaul University during the 1990–91 NCAA Division I men's basketball season. They were led by head coach Joey Meyer, in his 7th season, and played their home games at the Rosemont Horizon in Rosemont.

Roster

Schedule and results

|-
!colspan=9 style=| Regular Season

|-
!colspan=9 style=| NCAA Tournament

Source:

References 

DePaul
1990 in sports in Illinois
DePaul Blue Demons men's basketball seasons
1991 in sports in Illinois
DePaul